Vāsudeva, later incorporated as Vāsudeva-Krishna ("Krishna, son of Vasudeva"), Krishna-Vāsudeva or simply Krishna, was the son of Vasudeva Anakadundubhi, king of the Vrishnis in the region of Mathura. He was a leading member of the Vrishni heroes, and may well have been an historical ruler in the region of Mathura. 

Vāsudevism arose with the decline of Vedism in India, which occurred during the 8th to 6th century BCE. Vāsudeva then became the object of one of the earliest forms of personal deity worship in India, and is attested from around the 4th century BCE. At that time, Vāsudeva was already considered as a deity, as he appears in Pāṇini's writings in conjunction with Arjuna as an object of worship, since Pāṇini explains that a vāsudevaka is a devotee (bhakta) of Vāsudeva. 

By the end of the 2nd century BCE, Vāsudeva was considered as Devadeva, the "God of Gods", the Supreme Deity, whose emblem was the mythical bird Garuda, as known from the Heliodorus pillar inscription. This pillar, offered by the Greek ambassador and devotee Heliodorus, also shows that Vāsudeva even received dedications from the Indo-Greeks, who also represented him on the coinage of Agathocles of Bactria (190-180 BCE). The Heliodorus pillar, joining earth, space and heaven, is thought to symbolize the "cosmic axis" and express the cosmic totality of the Deity. Next to the pillar, a large Temple of Vāsudeva was discovered, where he was celebrated together with his deified kinsmen, the Vrishni heroes.

The cult of Vāsudeva was one of the major independent cults, together with the cults of Narayana, Shri and Lakshmi, which later coalesced to form Vishnuism. After the cult of Vāsudeva had been established, the tribe of the Vrishnis fused with the tribe of the Yadavas, who had their own hero-god named Krishna. The early Krishna is known from the Mahabharata, where he is described as the chief of the Yadavas kingdom of Dvārakā (modern Dwarka in Gujarat). The fused cult of Vāsudeva-Krishna became one of the significant traditions of the early history of Krishnaism, becoming a major component of the amalgamated worship of Krishna, the 8th incarnation of Vishnu. According to the Vaishnavite doctrine of the avatars, Vishnu takes various forms to rescue the world, and Vāsudeva-Krishna became understood as one of these forms, and one of the most popular ones. This process lasted from the 4th century BCE when Vāsudeva was an independent deity, to the 4th century CE, when Vishnu became much more prominent as the central deity of an integrated Vaishnavite cult, with Vāsudeva-Krishna now only one of his manifestations.

"Vāsudeva" is the first name to appear in the epigraphical record and in the earliest literary sources such as the writings of Pāṇini. It is unknown at what point of time precisely Vāsudeva came to be associated with "Krishna". The association between the names "Vāsudeva" and "Krishna" starts to appear with the Mahabharata and the Harivamsa, both completed in the 3rd century CE, where "Vāsudeva" appears as the patronymic of Krishna, his father being called Vasudeva Anakadundubhi in these writings. "Vāsudeva-Krishna" refers to "Krishna, son of Vasudeva", "Vāsudeva" in the lengthened form being a vṛddhi-derivative of the short form "Vasudeva" standing for Vasudeva Anakadundubhi, a type of formation very common in Sanskrit signifying "of, belonging to, descended from".

Evolution

The object of the Vāsudeva worship was initially the warrior hero of the Vrishni clan named Vāsudeva. Vāsudeva later became known as Krishna, who is "Vāsudeva" (i.e. "the son of Vasudeva", ie Vasudeva Anakadundubhi), a king of the Vrishni clan in the region of Mathura. Vāsudeva, historically is believed to be part of the Vrishni or Satvata tribe, and according to them his followers called themselves Bhagavatas. This religion formed between the 4th century BC and the 2nd century BC (the time of Patanjali), according to evidence in Megasthenes and in the Arthashastra of Kautilya, when Vāsudeva was worshiped as supreme Deity in a strongly monotheistic format, where the supreme Being was perfect, eternal and full of grace. In many sources outside of the cult, devotee or bhakta is defined as Vāsudevaka.

Evolution as a deity

The cult of Vāsudeva may have evolved from the worship of a historical figure belonging to the Vrishni clan in the region of Mathura. He is known as a member of the five "Vrishni heroes". 

It is thought that the hero deity Vāsudeva may have evolved into a Vaishnavite deity through a step-by-step process: 1) deification of the Vrishni heroes, of whom Vāduseva was the leader 2) association with the God Narayana-Vishnu 3) incorporation into the Vyuha concept of successive emanations of the God. In literature, the Vrishni heroes and Vāsudeva are mentioned by Pāṇini in Astadhyayi verse 6.2.34 around the 4th century BCE, while Krishna is referred to as Krishna Varshneya in verse 3.187.51 of the Mahabharata. Epigraphically, the deified status of Vāsudeva is confirmed by his appearance on the coinage of Agathocles of Bactria (190-180 BCE) and by the devotional character of the Heliodorus pillar inscription. Later, the association with Narayana (Vishnu) is confirmed by the Hathibada Ghosundi Inscriptions of the 1st century BCE. It is generally thought that "by the beginning of the Christian era, the cult of Vāsudeva, Vishnu and Narayana amalgamated". By the 2nd century CE, the "avatara concept was in its infancy", and the depiction of the four emanations of Vishnu (the Chatur-vyūha), consisting in the Vrishni heroes including Vāsudeva and minus Samba, starts to become visible in the art of Mathura at the end of the Kushan period.

The Harivamsa describes intricate relationships between Krishna Vāsudeva, Sankarsana, Pradyumna and Aniruddha that would later form a Vaishnava concept of primary quadrupled expansion, or chatur vyuha.

Vāsudeva is also associated with the qualities of gentleness and strength.

Fusion with other traditions
The tradition of Vāsudeva-Krishna is considered as separate from other ancient traditions such as that of Gopala-Krishna, with which it amalgamated at a later stage of the historical development. Some early scholars equate it with Bhagavatism. The cult of Krishna Vāsudeva ultimately merged with various traditions such as Bhagavatism, the cult of Gopala-Krishna or the cult of Bala-Krishna, to form the basis of the current tradition of monotheistic religion of Krishna:

An Indian Herakles

Arrian in his work Indica, quotes the earlier work of the same name by Megasthenes which claims that Herakles, son of Zeus had come to India and was honoured by the locals as an 'indigenous' Indian deity. This reference is understood to be to Vāsudeva. 

 

However Arrian himself does not consider the stories about Herakles credible, stating:

It has been proposed that Megasthenes misheard the words "Hari-Krishna" as "Herakles". According to Upinder Singh, "Vāsudeva-Krishna was the Indian God bearing the closest resemblance to the Greek God Herakles".

Heliodorus pillar and Temple of Vāsudeva (circa 115 BCE)

The cult of Vāsudeva soon extended well beyond the area of Mathura, as shown by the Heliodorus pillar, established by an Indo-Greek ambassador to the court of an Indian king in Vidisha, in the name of Vāsudeva.

In the Heliodorus pillar, Vāsudeva is described as Deva deva, the "God of Gods", the Supreme Deity. According to Harry Falk, making dedications to foreign gods was a logical practice for the Greeks, in order to appropriate their power: "Venerating Vāsudeva, as did Heliodor in the time of Antialkidas, should not be regarded as a "conversion" to Hinduism, but rather as the result of a search for the most helpful local powers, upholding own traditions in a foreign garb."

A large temple, probably dedicated to Vāsudeva or the Vrishni heroes, was also discovered next to the Heliodorus pillar at Vidisha. The Temple measured 30x30 meters, and the walls were 2.4 meters thick. Pottery finds confirmed that the Temple dated to the 2nd century BCE.  An earlier and smaller elliptic temple structure underneath probably dates to the end of the 3rd century BCE.

Naneghat inscription (1st century BCE)

The Naneghat inscription, dated to the 1st century BCE, mentions both Samkarshana and Vāsudeva, along with the Vedic deities of Indra, Chandra, and the four Lokapala guardians Yama, Varuna and Kubera and Vāsava. This provided the link between Vedic tradition and the Vaishnava tradition. Given it is inscribed in stone and dated to 1st-century BCE, it also linked the religious thought in the post-Vedic centuries in late 1st millennium BCE with those found in the unreliable highly variant texts such as the Puranas dated to later half of the 1st millennium CE. The inscription is a reliable historical record, providing a name and floruit to the Satavahana dynasty.

The first dedicatory sentence in the inscription mentions:

Gosundi inscription

Vāsudeva and Samkarshana are also mentioned in the 1st century BCE Hathibada Ghosundi Inscriptions:

Chilas petroglyphs
At Chilas II archeological site dated to the first half of 1st-century CE in northwest Pakistan, near the Afghanistan border, are engraved two males along with many Buddhist images nearby. The larger of the two males holds a plough and club in his two hands. The artwork also has an inscription with it in Kharosthi script, which has been deciphered by scholars as Rama-Krsna, and interpreted as an ancient depiction of the two brothers Balarama and Krishna.

Vāsudeva Temple in Mathura (circa 15 CE)

The Vasu Doorjamb Inscription is a significant early Sanskrit inscription from Mathura. The mention of Sodasa's time who, states Salomon, is "dated with reasonable certainty to the early early years of the first century AD". Its mention of Vasu, temple, Vedika and a torana (gateway) is significant as it confirms that the large temple building tradition was in vogue in the Mathura region by at least the start of the common era. Further, it also attests to the popularity of the Vāsudeva tradition in this period. The Vasu Doorjamb inscription of Sodasa in Uttar Pradesh viewed with other epigraphical evidence such as the Besnagar Heliodorus pillar in Madhya Pradesh, the Hathibada Ghosundi Inscriptions in Rajasthan, and the Naneghat inscriptions in Maharashtra suggest that the cult of Vāsudeva had spread over a wide region by the 1st-century BCE to the start of common era.

According to Quintanilla, the Vasu Doorjamb and the inscription is "one of the most important and most beautiful objects" from the time of Sodasa, likely from a "temple to Vāsudeva". The carvings on the doorjamb are three woven compositions. It has a leafy vine that runs along the length of the red sandstone jamb. Along the stem of the vine are curling leaves and blossoms, that wrap along as those found in nature, a rosette added in where the intertwining vines meet. The wider band has lotus rhizome carved in, with subtle naturalistic variations, wherein the lotus flowers are shown in all their stages of bloom, states Quintanilla.

Vāsudeva in 2nd century CE sculpture

Some sculptures during this period suggest that the concept of the avatars was starting to emerge, as images of "Chatur-vyūha" (the four emanations of Vishnu) are appearing. The famous "Caturvyūha Viṣṇu" statue in Mathura Museum is an attempt to show in one composition Vāsudeva (avatar of Vishnu) together with the other members of the Vrishni clan of the Pancharatra system: Samkarsana, Pradyumna and Aniruddha, with Samba missing, Vāsudeva being the central deity from whom the others emanate. The back of the relief is carved with the branches of a Kadamba tree, symbolically showing the relationship being the different deities. The depiction of Vishnu was stylistically derived from the type of the ornate Bodhisattvas, with rich jewelry and ornate headdress.

Two Kushan Empire emperors were named after Vāsudeva: Vāsudeva I (191–232 CE) and Vāsudeva II (275–300 CE).

Vāsudeva in the Kondamotu relief (4th century CE)
Vāsudeva appears prominently in a relief from Kondamotu, Guntur district in Andhra Pradesh, dating to the 4th century CE, which shows the Vrishni heroes standing in genealogical order around Narasimha. Vāsudeva follows Saṃkarṣaṇa, being second from the left in the place of seniority, with a hand in abhaya mudra and the other hand on the hip holding a conch shell. Vāsudeva also has a crown, which distinguishes him from the others. Then follow Pradyumna, holding a bow and an arrow, Samba, holding a wine goblet, and Aniruddha, holding a sword and a shield. The fact that they stand around Narasimha suggests a fusion of the Satvata cult with the Vrishni cult at this point.

Transition from Vāsudeva to Vishnu (4th-5th century CE)

Iconographic transition

Various early statues showing a deity with the attributes of Vāsudeva have long been attributed to Vishnu. But it is now thought that statues dedicated to the worship of Vishnu only started to appear from the 4th century CE during the Gupta Empire period, derived from, and using the attributes of Vāsudeva, but adding an aureole starting at the shoulders: the Vishnu Caturanana ("Four-Armed Vishnu") statues. The statues before the 4th century CE have been reattributed to Vāsudeva, a period during which Vāsudeva seems to have been much more important than Vishnu.

Other statues of Vishnu show him as three-headed (with an implied fourth head in the back), the Visnu Vaikuntha Chaturmurti or Chaturvyuha ("Four-Emanations") type, where Vishnu has a human head, flanked by the muzzle of a boar (his avatar Varaha) and the head of a lion (his avatar Narasimha), two of his most important and ancient avatars, laid out upon his aureole. Recent scholarship considers that these "Vishnu" statues still show the emanation Vāsudeva Krishna as the central human-shaped deity, rather than the Supreme God Vishnu himself.

Theological transition
Over centuries, the cult of Vāsudeva transformed into Vaishnavism. Overall, "Vaishnavite Hinduism is believed to have originated in the 4th century BC in the cult of Vāsudeva-Krishna, which was then grafted in the 2nd century AD onto the cult of Narayana. By the 4th century, Vishnu's prominence increased considerably. He was now regarded as a member of the Trimurti, the cosmic triad of Gods, Brahma, Vishnu and Shiva".

From the 4-5th century, Vāsudeva-Krsna is identified with Vishnu and Narayana, and fuses with Gopala-Krishna:

Vāsudeva at Deogarh (6th century CE)

The Dashavatara Temple in Deogarh is closely related to the iconic architectural temple structure described in the Viṣṇudharmottara purāṇa, and can be interpreted as an architectural representation of the Caturvyuha concept and the Pancaratra doctrine, centering on the depictions of the four main emanations of Vishnu: Vāsudeva, Samkarshana, Pradyumna and Aniruddha. According to Lubotsky, it is likely that the entrance is dedicated to the Vāsudeva aspect of Vishnu; the Anantashayana side is his role as the creator (Aniruddha); the sage form of Nara-Narayana side symbolizes his preservation and maintainer role in cosmic existence (Pradyumna); and the Gajendramoksha side represents his role as the destroyer (Samkarsana).

Vasudev

To this day, a group of religious mendicants known as Vasudevs are people believed to be incarnation of Lord Krishna. Bedecked in the distinctive headgear of peacock feathers, performers sing Vasudev songs and with nimble, delicate dance steps, whirl around presenting anecdotes from Lord Krishna's life in exchange for alms. They sing soothing, melodious notes through the villages in the morning time.

Devotion
A popular short prayer for worshipping Vāsudeva is Dwadashaakshar ("the twelve-syllable mantra"), consisting in the recitation of the phrase "Om Namo Bhagavate Vāsudevāya" (in devanagari:  ॐ नमो भगवते वासुदेवाय), which is one of the most popular Hindu mantras, and the most important mantra in Vaishnavism. It means "Om, I bow to Lord Vāsudeva", who is variously understood as Krishna or Vishnu.

See also
 Radha Krishna
 Krishna in the Mahābhārata
 Bhagavad Gita
 Bhagavata Purana
 Historicity of the Mahabharata

Notes

References

Further reading 

 

 
 
BHATTACHARYA, Gouriswar: Vanamala of Vasudeva-Krsna-Visnu and Sankarsana-Balarama. In: Vanamala. Festschrift A.J. Gail. Serta Adalberto Joanni Gail LXV. diem natalem celebranti ab amicis collegis discipulis dedicata. Gerd J.R. Mevissen et Klaus Bruhn redigerunt. Berlin 2006; pp. 9–20.
COUTURE, André: The emergence of a group of four characters (Vasudeva, Samkarsana, Pradyumna, and Aniruddha) in the Harivamsa: points for consideration. Journal of Indian Philosophy 34,6 (2006) 571–585.

Forms of Krishna